Fantasmagorie may refer to:

 Fantasmagorie, a 1908 French short film, an early piece of animation
 Fantasmagorie, a 2006 album by the Polish band Akurat

See also
Phantasmagoria, a form of illusion performance and horror theatre using magic lanterns
Phantasmagoria (disambiguation)
Phantasm (disambiguation)
Fantasmagoria, an Argentinian rock band